Cordata, a Latin adjective meaning heart-shaped, may refer to:

Cordata, a common leaf shape
Cordata (company), an American personal computer company

Species
Alnus cordata, a species of alder
Houttuynia cordata, a flowering plant native to Southeast Asia
Macleaya cordata, a species of poppy
Quararibea cordata, a fruit tree native to the Amazon Rainforest
Tilia cordata, known as the small-leaved lime or linden
Prunus subcordata, a shrub in the plum family
Eucnide cordata, a perennial shrub in the family Loasaceae native to the Sonoran Desert Region

See also 
 Cordatum, a species of sea urchin
 Chordate, a phylum of animals having a dorsal nerve cord